Lorenzo Carissoni (born 7 February 1997) is an Italian professional footballer who plays as a right back for  club Latina.

Club career
On 3 August 2019, he joined Lecco on loan.

On 1 February 2021, he moved to Vis Pesaro.

On 18 November 2021, he signed with Latina.

References

1997 births
Living people
Sportspeople from the Province of Bergamo
Footballers from Lombardy
Italian footballers
Association football defenders
Serie C players
Serie D players
A.C. Ponte San Pietro Isola S.S.D. players
Torino F.C. players
Trapani Calcio players
S.S. Monopoli 1966 players
A.C. Monza players
Carrarese Calcio players
Calcio Lecco 1912 players
Vis Pesaro dal 1898 players
Latina Calcio 1932 players
Italy youth international footballers